Metacercops praestricta is a moth of the family Gracillariidae. It is known from South Africa.

References

Acrocercopinae
Endemic moths of South Africa
Moths described in 1918